A Chinese garden is a style of garden.

Chinese Garden may also refer to:

 Dunedin Chinese Garden, a Chinese garden in Dunedin, New Zealand
 Seattle Chinese Garden, a Chinese garden in Seattle, Washington, United States
 Chinese Garden, Singapore, a Chinese garden in Singapore
 Chinese Garden, Zurich, a Chinese garden in Zurich, Switzerland
 Chinese Garden MRT station, a railway station in Singapore